The Carbomycetaceae are a family of fungi in the order Pezizales. The family contains the single genus Carbomyces, which in turn contains three species distributed in the United States and Mexico.

References

External links

Pezizales
Pezizales genera